VEON Ltd. (formerly VimpelCom Ltd.) is a Dutch-domiciled multinational telecommunication services company. It predominantly operates services in the regions of Asia, Africa and Europe. It is the 13th largest mobile network operator in the world by number of subscribers  The company operates in eight markets including Bangladesh, Georgia, Kazakhstan, Kyrgyzstan, Pakistan, Russia, Ukraine and Uzbekistan.  VEON's brands include Beeline, Kyivstar, Jazz Pakistan, Banglalink and others.

History 

Russian PJSC VimpelCom was founded in 1992 in Moscow when VimpelCom's co-founders, Russian Dmitry Zimin and American Augie K. Fabela II came together to pioneer a new direction in the Russian mobile industry - their company was one of the first mobile carriers in Russia. Augie Fabela, who was then a young entrepreneur from the United States, and Zimin, who was a Russian scientist in his fifties, together launched the Beeline brand in 1993.  Its name derives from вымпел, the Russian word for pennon.

Stock Exchange Listing 

VEON is listed on Nasdaq in New York and Euronext in Amsterdam. The company has thousands of shareholders from around the world.

Company History 

VimpelCom Ltd. holding company was founded in 2009. In 2009, Telenor and Alfa agreed to merge their assets in VimpelCom and Kyivstar (Ukraine's number one wireless operator) with the aim of creating VimpelCom Ltd. (incorporated in Bermuda).

In October 2010, the united company acquired from Naguib Sawiris two assets:
 Orascom Telecom Holding S.A.E., the largest mobile phone company in North Africa;
 Wind, the third largest mobile phone company in Italy.

As of 31 December 2011, the company had 205 million customers across 20 countries. After several divestments and a business transformation, by summer 2017, VEON had a combined subscriber base of more than 200 million across 12 markets.

The company announced that it would switch the listing of its ADS shares from the NYSE to the NASDAQ with trading beginning on 10 September 2013.

In February 2015, the government of Algeria acquired a 51% stake in Djezzy for US$2.6 billion.

2015–present 
In September 2014, VimpelCom agreed to sell its majority stake in Canadian mobile operator Wind Mobile for $272 million to its minority owner Globalive.

In summer 2015, the United States Justice Department claimed that VimpelCom used a network of shell companies and phony consulting contracts to funnel bribes to a close relative of the president of Uzbekistan, in exchange for access to that country's telecommunications market.  The board of one part-owner, Norwegian telecom operator Telenor, has severed consulting ties with its former chief executive Jon Fredrik Baksaas due to the continuing police investigation.

In November 2015 the CEO, Jo Lunder was arrested on corruption charges in Oslo, Norway. The case alleges that in exchange for an operating license, VimpelCom has funneled $57.5M to Takilant, a company linked to Gulnara Karimova, the daughter of Uzbek President Islam Karimov.

In February 2016, the Securities and Exchange Commission announced a global settlement along with the U.S. Department of Justice and Dutch regulators that requires telecommunications provider VimpelCom Ltd. to pay more than $795 million to resolve its violations of the Foreign Corrupt Practices Act (FCPA) to win business in Uzbekistan.

In February 2017, VimpelCom renamed itself VEON, named after the messaging platform that it had developed. The company explained that the re-branding, under the guidance of Peter Arnell, was part of a shift towards marketing themselves as a technology company, and not solely a telecommunications firm. In April 2017, VEON announced the listing and trading of shares of VEON on Euronext Amsterdam.

In July 2017, VEON announced launching Personal Internet Platform named VEON in major markets: Italy, Ukraine, Bangladesh, Pakistan and Georgia. The platform provides contextualized, personalized internet experiences and opportunities, enabling customers to call, chat, read, watch, listen and share media, manage account (top up, opt in/out services).

In March 2018, CEO Jean-Yves Charlier resigned and CEO duties were temporarily assumed by VEON's chair, Ursula Burns. Burns was appointed as CEO, while remaining as chairman, in December 2018.

In October 2019, VEON hired former ex-Turkcell CEO Kaan Terzioğlu as COO of VEON Group, together with Sergi Herrero.

In February 2020, Herrero and Terzioğlu were appointed co-CEOs, succeeding Burns.

In June 2020, Gennady Gazin succeeded Burns as chairman.

Veon will buy remaining 15% shares in Jazz from Abu Dhabi Group for 100pc ownership

Owners 
Veon Shareholder Structure:

 47.9% of common and voting shares owned by LetterOne (Alfa Group)
 43.8% of common and voting shares - Free Float (Minority Shareholders)
 8.3%  of common and voting shares - The Stichting

Subsidiaries and shareholdings 
 PJSC VimpelCom (100%)
 Golden Telecom and Golden Telecom Ukraine (Delaware, United States, acquired in 2007)
 Corbina Telecom (acquired in 2006)
 Cityline (ISP) (acquired in 2001)
 Global TeleSystems (GTS), formerly San Francisco Moscow Teleport (SFMT), founded in 1983 by VNIIPAS and an American team which included George Soros
 EDN Sovintel (Soviet-American joint venture company founded in 1990, acquired in 2001)
 SovAm (Soviet-American) Teleport (founded in 1990 by SFMT)
 GlasNet
 Russia-On-Line  (acquired in 1999)
 Kyivstar (100%)
 Orascom Telecom Holding S.A.E. (51.7%)
 SLTMobitel (44.98%)
 Euroset (50%)
 VEON Wholesale Services (100%)
 Jazz (100%)
 Banglalink (100%)
 E-Mobile (100%)

See also 

 Mobile phone industry in Russia
 Telecommunications in Ukraine
 Telecommunications in Pakistan
 Dmitry Zimin
 Mikhail Fridman
 Naguib Sawiris

References

External links 
 
 VEON App Launched

VEON
Telecommunications companies of the Netherlands
Holding companies of the Netherlands
Internet service providers of the Netherlands
Mobile phone companies of the Netherlands
Telenor
Multinational companies headquartered in the Netherlands
Companies based in Amsterdam
Holding companies established in 2009
Telecommunications companies established in 2009
2009 establishments in the Netherlands
Companies formerly listed on the New York Stock Exchange
Companies listed on the Nasdaq
Alfa Group
Dutch brands